Kankarisvesi is a rather small lake of Finland. It belongs to the Kymijoki main catchment area. It is located in Jämsä in the region of Keski-Suomi. It is also a part of Jämsä catchment area. The lake is narrow and about 10 kilometers long. It is a part of 75 kilometer canoeing route named Wanha Witonen from Petäjävesi to Arvaja on the lake Päijänne. The southern part of the lake is an area for sport rowing.

See also
List of lakes in Finland

References

Landforms of Central Finland
Lakes of Jämsä